Russian Orthodox University of Saint John the Divine(ROU) is an institution of higher religious education of the Russian Orthodox Church, reestablished in 2011 in accordance with the decree of Patriarch of Moscow and all Rus' Kirill I of Moscow at the base of Russian Orthodox Institute of St. John the Divine which were founded in 1992 by the Patriarch of Moscow and all Rus' Alexy II of Moscow. Rector of the University — Hegumen Peter (Yeremeev). University has a state educational license and accreditation.

The university was located on the territory of the temple complex in the name of St. John the Evangelist at the Elm - patriarchal Metochion in Kitay-gorod (on New Square), Moscow. Nowadays RPU is located in Chernyshevsky lane.

Structure 

 Faculties

 Faculty of Philosophy and Theology
 Faculty of Humanities
 Faculty of Psychology
 Faculty of Church Ministry
 Department of Philology and Journalism

Assessments 

Russian religious scholar and historian of philosophy Kontantin M. Antonov think, that along with the Moscow Theological Academy, ROU is "leading church universities".

References

External links
 Официальный сайт РПУ
 Официальный сайт МПИ
 Фома. Программа для тех, кто хочет верить на радиостанции «Говорит Москва» // RPI.SU, 20.02.2011.
 Православный университет на Новой площади // «Московская правда», выпуск от 3 июня 2011 г.
 Дмитрий Анохин Вуз под вязом // Журнал Московской Патриархии № 9, сентябрь 2018
 Открытое письмо студентов и выпускников Российского Православного института им. Иоанна Богослова Патриарху Кириллу
 Информационно-аналитические материалы по результатам проведения мониторинга эффективности деятельности образовательных организаций высшего образования 2018 года

Universities and colleges affiliated with the Russian Orthodox Church
Universities and colleges in Moscow